Nikolayevsky (masculine), Nikolayevskaya (feminine), or Nikolayevskoye (neuter) is the name of several rural localities in Russia.

Astrakhan Oblast
As of 2010, one rural locality in Astrakhan Oblast bears this name:
Nikolayevsky, Astrakhan Oblast, a settlement in Karaulinsky Selsoviet of Kamyzyaksky District

Belgorod Oblast
As of 2010, one rural locality in Belgorod Oblast bears this name:
Nikolayevsky, Belgorod Oblast, a settlement in Krasnogvardeysky District

Bryansk Oblast
As of 2010, two rural localities in Bryansk Oblast bear this name:
Nikolayevsky, Brasovsky District, Bryansk Oblast, a settlement in Snytkinsky Selsoviet of Brasovsky District
Nikolayevsky, Pochepsky District, Bryansk Oblast, a settlement in Baklansky Selsoviet of Pochepsky District

Republic of Buryatia
As of 2010, one rural locality in the Republic of Buryatia bears this name:
Nikolayevsky, Republic of Buryatia, a settlement in Zavodskoy Selsoviet of Tarbagataysky District

Chuvash Republic
As of 2010, one rural locality in the Chuvash Republic bears this name:
Nikolayevskoye, Chuvash Republic, a selo in Nikolayevskoye Rural Settlement of Yadrinsky District

Irkutsk Oblast
As of 2010, one rural locality in Irkutsk Oblast bears this name:
Nikolayevsky, Irkutsk Oblast, an area in Zalarinsky District

Karachay–Cherkess Republic
As of 2010, one rural locality in the Karachay–Cherkess Republic bears this name:
Nikolayevskoye, Karachay–Cherkess Republic, a selo in Prikubansky District

Kirov Oblast
As of 2010, one rural locality in Kirov Oblast bears this name:
Nikolayevskoye, Kirov Oblast, a selo in Gostovsky Rural Okrug of Shabalinsky District

Kostroma Oblast
As of 2010, one rural locality in Kostroma Oblast bears this name:
Nikolayevskoye, Kostroma Oblast, a village in Yekaterinkinskoye Settlement of Kadyysky District

Leningrad Oblast
As of 2010, one rural locality in Leningrad Oblast bears this name:
Nikolayevskoye, Leningrad Oblast, a village in Osminskoye Settlement Municipal Formation of Luzhsky District

Mari El Republic
As of 2010, one rural locality in the Mari El Republic bears this name:
Nikolayevsky, Mari El Republic, a vyselok in Shelangersky Rural Okrug of Zvenigovsky District

Nizhny Novgorod Oblast
As of 2010, two rural localities in Nizhny Novgorod Oblast bear this name:
Nikolayevsky, Nizhny Novgorod Oblast, a pochinok in Tumaninsky Selsoviet of Shakhunsky District
Nikolayevskoye, Nizhny Novgorod Oblast, a village in Vyazovsky Selsoviet of Tonkinsky District

Republic of North Ossetia–Alania
As of 2010, one rural locality in the Republic of North Ossetia–Alania bears this name:
Nikolayevskaya, Republic of North Ossetia–Alania, a stanitsa in Nikolayevskoye Rural Settlement of Digorsky District

Novgorod Oblast
As of 2010, two rural localities in Novgorod Oblast bear this name:
Nikolayevskoye, Maryovsky District, Novgorod Oblast, a village in Molvotitskoye Settlement of Maryovsky District
Nikolayevskoye, Moshenskoy District, Novgorod Oblast, a village in Orekhovskoye Settlement of Moshenskoy District

Novosibirsk Oblast
As of 2010, one rural locality in Novosibirsk Oblast bears this name:
Nikolayevsky, Novosibirsk Oblast, a settlement in Kochkovsky District

Oryol Oblast
As of 2010, one rural locality in Oryol Oblast bears this name:
Nikolayevsky, Oryol Oblast, a settlement in Druzhensky Selsoviet of Dmitrovsky District

Perm Krai
As of 2010, one rural locality in Perm Krai bears this name:
Nikolayevsky, Perm Krai, a settlement in Chernushinsky District

Rostov Oblast
As of 2010, five rural localities in Rostov Oblast bear this name:
Nikolayevsky, Kagalnitsky District, Rostov Oblast, a khutor in Kirovskoye Rural Settlement of Kagalnitsky District
Nikolayevsky, Milyutinsky District, Rostov Oblast, a khutor in Nikolo-Berezovskoye Rural Settlement of Milyutinsky District
Nikolayevsky, Orlovsky District, Rostov Oblast, a khutor in Proletarskoye Rural Settlement of Orlovsky District
Nikolayevsky, Zimovnikovsky District, Rostov Oblast, a khutor in Leninskoye Rural Settlement of Zimovnikovsky District
Nikolayevskaya, Rostov Oblast, a stanitsa in Nikolayevskoye Rural Settlement of Konstantinovsky District

Ryazan Oblast
As of 2010, one rural locality in Ryazan Oblast bears this name:
Nikolayevskoye, Ryazan Oblast, a selo in Krutoyarsky Rural Okrug of Kasimovsky District

Smolensk Oblast
As of 2010, two rural localities in Smolensk Oblast bear this name:
Nikolayevskoye, Glinkovsky District, Smolensk Oblast, a village in Glinkovskoye Rural Settlement of Glinkovsky District
Nikolayevskoye, Roslavlsky District, Smolensk Oblast, a village in Syrokorenskoye Rural Settlement of Roslavlsky District

Stavropol Krai
As of 2010, one rural locality in Stavropol Krai bears this name:
Nikolayevsky, Stavropol Krai, a khutor in Andropovsky District

Tambov Oblast
As of 2010, one rural locality in Tambov Oblast bears this name:
Nikolayevsky, Tambov Oblast, a settlement in Alexandrovsky Selsoviet of Rzhaksinsky District

Tver Oblast
As of 2010, three rural localities in Tver Oblast bear this name:
Nikolayevskoye, Maksatikhinsky District, Tver Oblast, a village in Maksatikhinsky District
Nikolayevskoye, Toropetsky District, Tver Oblast, a village in Toropetsky District
Nikolayevskoye, Vyshnevolotsky District, Tver Oblast, a village in Vyshnevolotsky District

Volgograd Oblast
As of 2010, one rural locality in Volgograd Oblast bears this name:
Nikolayevsky, Volgograd Oblast, a khutor in Verkhnekardailsky Selsoviet of Novonikolayevsky District

Vologda Oblast
As of 2010, one rural locality in Vologda Oblast bears this name:
Nikolayevskaya, Vologda Oblast, a village in Shevdenitsky Selsoviet of Tarnogsky District

Yaroslavl Oblast
As of 2010, one rural locality in Yaroslavl Oblast bears this name:
Nikolayevskoye, Yaroslavl Oblast, a village in Markovsky Rural Okrug of Bolsheselsky District

Zabaykalsky Krai
As of 2010, one rural locality in Zabaykalsky Krai bears this name:
Nikolayevskoye, Zabaykalsky Krai, a selo in Ulyotovsky District